Sonwabile Fassi (born 14 March 1991) is a South African former cricketer. He played in one Twenty20 match for Border in 2011.

See also
 List of Border representative cricketers

References

External links
 

1991 births
Living people
South African cricketers
Border cricketers
People from Mdantsane
Cricketers from the Eastern Cape